Kooigem is a submunicipality of the city of Kortrijk, Belgium. As of 2007 it had a population of 791.

Sub-municipalities of Kortrijk
Populated places in West Flanders